The Association of Mideast Colleges was a short-lived NCAA Division III conference composed of member schools located in the Midwestern United States. The league existed from 1991 to 1996.

Member schools

Final members

Notes

Former members

Membership timeline

Football champions
 1991 – 
 1992 – 
 1993 – 
 1994 –  and 
 1995 –

Yearly football standings

See also
 List of defunct college football conferences

References